The Gigalitz is a mountain, on the Floitenkamm ridge of the Zillertal Alps between the bottoms of Floitengrund and Stillupgrund. It is the Hausberg of the Greizer Hut.

Ascent 
From the Greizer Hut the path runs up to the col of Lapenscharte (crossing to the Kasseler Hut) to a signed fork at a height of about 2,500 m. It continues on an unmarked path to the unprominent southwestern arête and then on grassy schrofen to the two summits. On the north top there is a metal orientation rose. The journey time from the Greizer Hut is about 2.5 hours. (775 metres of height difference).

Summit cross 
In July 2006 a summit cross was funded and erected by the "FND" (Freitag nach Dienst = "Friday After Work") pub regulars (Stammtischrunde).

Climbing tour 
One of several climbing tours, with 7 rope lengths and UIAA grade 4+/5-, is laid out on the neighbouring Gigalitzturm rock tower (2,978 m). The start of this climb is on the Lapenscharte col.

Literature 
 Heinrich and Walter Klier: Zillertaler Alpen, Alpine Club Guide. Bergverlag Rudolf Rother, Munich, 1996,

Map 
 Alpine Club map 1:25,000 series, Sheet 35/2

External links 

Alpine three-thousanders
Mountains of the Alps
Mountains of Tyrol (state)
Zillertal Alps